Torsten Oehrl (born 7 January 1986) is a German former professional footballer who played as a striker.

Career
In 2013, Oehrl joined Eintracht Braunschweig from FC Augsburg. In August 2015, he transferred from Braunschweig to 3. Liga side SV Wehen Wiesbaden.

He was a youth international for Germany, most recently for the under-19 team.

References

External links
 
 
 

1986 births
Living people
People from Lichtenfels, Bavaria
People from Coburg (district)
Sportspeople from Upper Franconia
Footballers from Bavaria
German footballers
Germany youth international footballers
Association football forwards
Bundesliga players
2. Bundesliga players
3. Liga players
Regionalliga players
SpVgg Greuther Fürth II players
SpVgg Greuther Fürth players
Kickers Offenbach players
Eintracht Braunschweig players
Eintracht Braunschweig II players
SV Werder Bremen players
SV Werder Bremen II players
Fortuna Düsseldorf players
FC Augsburg players
SV Wehen Wiesbaden players
FC Bayern Munich II players